Mezőkövesdi Sport Egyesület is a football club located in Mezőkövesd, Hungary. The team's colors are yellow and blue. The team name comes from the Zsóry family who founded the thermal baths that brought wealth to the town.

History
The club was founded in 1975.

On 5 June 2016, Mezőkövesdi SE hosted Dunaújváros PASE on the 30th match day in the 2015–16 Nemzeti Bajnokság II season at the newly built Mezőkövesdi Városi Stadion. The match was won by the home team which also resulted the club's promotion to the 2016–17 Nemzeti Bajnokság I.

On 16 July 2016, Mezőkövesd played their first match in the 2016–17 Nemzeti Bajnokság I season at the Mezőkövesdi Városi Stadion against Gyirmót FC Győr. The match ended with a 2–2 draw.

In the 2016–17 Magyar Kupa season, Mezőkövesd were eliminated in the semi-finals by Vasas SC on 7–0 aggregate. By reaching the semi-finals Mezőkövesd set a record in the Magyar Kupa. In the first leg, Mezőkövesd lost 2–0 at the Szusza Ferenc Stadion, while in the second leg, Mezőkövesd lost 5–0 at the Városi Stadion on 17 May 2017.

In the 2016–17 Nemzeti Bajnokság I season, Mezőkövesd were escaping from relegation along with Debreceni VSC, Diósgyőri VTK, and MTK Budapest. On the 32nd matchday, Mezőkövesd hosted Paksi FC and won the match with a late goal by Gohér at the Városi Stadion on 20 May 2017.

The club was featured in the Worldsoccer.com.

In the 2019-20 Magyar Kupa, the club reached the final by defeating Hévíz in the round of 128, Sényő in the round of 64, Győr in the round of 32, Kaposvár in the round of 16, Puskás Akadémia in the quarter-finals, Fehérvár in the semi-finals. In the 2020 Magyar Kupa Final, Mezőkövesd was beaten by Budapest Honvéd FC 2-1 at the Puskás Aréna.

Stadium

Mezőkövesd play their home matches at the Városi Stadion, located in Mezőkövesd. On 5 June 2016, the first match was played in the stadium. Mezőkövesd hosted Dunaújváros PASE on the 30th match day in the 2015–16 Nemzeti Bajnokság II season. The match was won by the home team which also resulted the club's promotion to the 2016–17 Nemzeti Bajnokság I.

In the 2016–17 Nemzeti Bajnokság I season, Diósgyőri VTK played some of their home matches due to the demolition of their home stadium Diósgyőri Stadion. Nevertheless, when Diósgyőr hosted Mezőkövesd on the 31st match day the match was played at Debrecen's home stadium, Nagyerdei Stadion.

Honours
Nemzeti Bajnokság II:
Winners (1): 2012–13
Runners-up (1): 2015–16
Magyar Kupa:
Runners-up (1): 2019-20

Players

Current squad

Out on loan

Players with multiple nationalities
  Shandor Vayda

Season results

Managers 
 Géza Huszák (2 April 2008 – 3 October 2011)
 György Szabados (7 October 2011 – 21 March 2012)
 György Véber (21 March 2012 – 5 May 2014)
 László Tóth (6 May 2014 – 21 March 21, 2015)
 Tamás Lucsánszky (25 March 2015 – December 2015)
 Attila Pintér (30 December 2015 – 22 December 2016)
 Tomislav Sivić (27 December 2016 – 2 May 2017)
 Mikuláš Radványi (2 May 2017 – 16 October 2017)
 Attila Kuttor (17 October 2017 – 10 November 2020)
 Attila Pintér (11 November 2015 – 6 October 2021)
 Attila Supka (6 October 2021 – 6 September 2022)
 Attila Kuttor (14 September 2022 – present)

References

External links 
  
 Soccerway

 
Football clubs in Hungary
Association football clubs established in 1975
1975 establishments in Hungary
Borsod-Abaúj-Zemplén County